

Events
May 1 – George Frideric Handel begins the tradition of benefit performances of his oratorio Messiah at and for the Foundling Hospital in London.
Farinelli is knighted by King Ferdinand VI of Spain.
Ten-year-old Carl Ditters von Dittersdorf begins playing with the Viennese Schottenkirche orchestra.
Bach dictates Chorale preludes BWV 666 and 667 to pupil and son-in-law Johann Christoph Altnikol.  These are then added to the manuscript of the Great Eighteen Chorale Preludes (BWV 668 is added posthumously).

Classical music
 1750 is commonly used to mark the end of the Baroque period
 CPE Bach 
 Cello Concerto in A minor, H.432
 Harpsichord Concerto in D major, H.433
Nicolas Chedeville – Les impromptus de Fontainebleau, Op.12
Francesco Durante – Litania della Beata Maria Vergine in fa minore, a 4 voci
George Frederic Handel – Theodora, HWV 68 (Oratorio, premiered Mar. 16 in London)
Niccolo Jommelli – Laudate pueri Dominum
Leopold Mozart – Partita for Violin, Cello and Double Bass ("Frog")
Niccolò Pasquali – XII English songs in score. Collected from several masques and other entertainments... (London)
Approximate date
Willem de Fesch – 6 Cello Sonatas, Op.13
Joseph Haydn – Divertimento in A major, Hob.XVI:5
Franz Xaver Richter 
Symphony in D major, VB 52
Symphony in B-flat major, VB 59
Filippo Rosa – Recorder Sonata in F major

Opera
Johann Friedrich Agricola – Il filosofo convinto in amore
William Boyce – The Roman Father
Baldassare Galuppi – Il mondo alla roversa, premiered Nov. 14 in Venice
Johann Adolf Hasse – Attilio Regolo, premiered Jan. 12 in Dresden.
Niccolo Jommelli – L’uccellatrice

Births
January 25 – Johann Gottfried Vierling, German organist and composer (died 1813)
March 23 – Johannes Matthias Sperger, Austrian contrabassist and composer (died 1812)
August 18 – Antonio Salieri, Italian-born composer (died 1825)
November – Anton Stamitz, German composer (died c.1805)
December 3 
Johann Martin Miller, hymnist and lyricist (died 1814)
Johann Franz Xaver Sterkel, composer and pianist (died 1817)
date unknown 
Benoît-Joseph Marsollier des Vivetières, librettist (died 1817)
Mikhail Matinsky, Russian mathematician, librettist and opera composer (died c. 1820)
Jean Balthasar Tricklir, cellist and composer (died 1813)
probable – Antonio Rosetti, born Franz Anton Rösler, Bohemian-born composer (died 1792)

Deaths
January 4 – Christoph Schütz, German music publisher (born 1689)
January 29 – Sophia Schröder, Swedish soprano at the Kungliga Hovkapellet (born 1712)
February 22 – Pietro Filippo Scarlatti, Italian organist, choirmaster and composer (born 1679)
March 6 – Domenico Montagnana, Italian luthier (born 1686)
June 2 – Valentin Rathgeber, German composer (born 1682)
June 14 – Franz Anton Maichelbeck, composer (born 1702) 
July 28 – Johann Sebastian Bach, German composer (born 1685)
August – John Tufts, American music teacher (born 1689)
September 4 – José de Cañizares, librettist (born 1676)
September 15 – Charles Theodore Pachelbel, German-born organist, harpsichordist and composer (born 1690)
September 28 – Johann Sigismund Scholze, music anthologist (born 1705)
October 3 – Georg Matthias Monn, Austrian composer (born 1717)
October 16 – Sylvius Leopold Weiss, German lutenist and composer (born 1687)
November – Giuseppe Sammartini, Italian-born oboist and composer (born 1695)
November 11 – Apostolo Zeno, librettist (born 1668)
November 15 – Pantaleon Hebenstreit, German dance teacher, musician, composer and inventor of the pantalon (born 1668)
November 25 – Francesco Feroci, composer (born 1673)
date unknown – Francesco Goffriller, Italian violin maker (born 1692)

References

 
18th century in music
Music by year